Hale Bridge is a historic structure located south of Anamosa, Iowa, United States. It is an example of a bowstring through-arch truss bridge. Perhaps thousands of these bridges were built in Iowa in the late 1860s through the 1870s. However, by 1992, fewer than twenty survive.

In April 1877 the Jones County Board of Supervisors contracted with the King Iron Bridge and Manufacturing Co. of Cleveland to provide iron bridges to the county for the next year. Pile driving for this bridge's substructure got underway soon after, and the piers were completed by early fall. King provided a  bowstring through arch-truss and a shorter pony arch in the winter of 1878. The bridge's configuration was changed the following spring and the county ordered another pony truss to replace the original timber approach. The bridge was completed in June 1879, and listed on the National Register of Historic Places in 1998. The Hale Bridge remained in its original location near the unincorporated community of Hale until 2006 when it was moved upriver to Wapsipinicon State Park south of Anamosa.

See also

List of bridges documented by the Historic American Engineering Record in Iowa
List of bridges on the National Register of Historic Places in Iowa
National Register of Historic Places listings in Jones County, Iowa

References

External links

Bridges completed in 1879
Bridges in Jones County, Iowa
Historic American Engineering Record in Iowa
National Register of Historic Places in Jones County, Iowa
Road bridges on the National Register of Historic Places in Iowa
Truss bridges in Iowa
Relocated buildings and structures in Iowa
Through arch bridges in the United States
Bowstring truss bridges in the United States